The year 1630 in science and technology involved some significant events.

Astronomy
 Following his recently completed Rudolphine Tables, Kepler predicted a transit of Mercury on 7 November 1631 and a transit of Venus on 6 December 1631. He wrote an "admonition" to astronomers to prepare for observations on these dates, which was published after his death by Jacob Bartsch.

Mathematics
 Pierre de Fermat studies the curve later known as the "Witch of Agnesi".

Microscopy
 Francesco Stelluti's , published in Rome, is the first book to contain images of organisms viewed through the microscope.

Technology
 Cornelius Drebbel produces an early form of magic lantern or slide projector.

Events
 The first laws prohibiting gambling in America are passed.

Births
 July 19 – François Cureau de La Chambre, French physician (died 1680)
 September 13 – Olof Rudbeck, Swedish physiologist (died 1702)
 October – Isaac Barrow, English mathematician (died 1677)
 possible date – Johann Kunckel, German chemist (died 1703)

Deaths
 November 15 – Johannes Kepler, astronomer (born 1571)
 Federico Cesi, founder of Accademia Nazionale dei Lincei, in Rome, Italy (born 1586)
 Johannes Schreck (also known as Johannes Terrenz or Terrentius), explorer (born 1576)

References

 
17th century in science
1630s in science